is a railway station in Nagasaki City, Nagasaki Prefecture, Japan. It is operated by JR Kyushu and is on the Nagasaki Main Line.

Lines

Station layout 
The station consists of two side platforms serving two tracks. A third through-track runs in between the two. There is no station building. A small shed, integrated with the shelter for platform 1 used to house a ticket window but, as the station is now unstaffed, it has been converted into a compartment for an automatic ticket vending machine. A SUGOCA card reader is also provided at the station entrance. Although it is possible to access platform 1 from the access road without any steps, access to platform 2 requires the use of a footbridge.

Adjacent stations

History
Hizen-Koga was opened on the same day as one of the intermediate stations along this new route. With the privatization of JNR on 1 April 1987, control of the station passed to JR Kyushu.

Passenger statistics
In fiscal 2016, the station was used by an average of 617 passengers daily (boarding passengers only), and it ranked 218th  among the busiest stations of JR Kyushu.

Environs
Nagasaki Junshin University and College
Nagasaki City Takashirodai Elementary School Utsutsugawa Branch
Nagasaki Bypass

References

External links
Utsutsugawa Station (JR Kyushu)

Railway stations in Nagasaki Prefecture
Nagasaki Main Line
Railway stations in Japan opened in 1972